Price of Glory is a 2000 American sports drama film written by Phil Berger, directed by Carlos Avila and starring Jimmy Smits. The movie was nominated for several ALMA Awards in 2001. The film was shot in Huntington Park, California, Los Angeles, California, and Nogales, Arizona. The film was released by New Line Cinema on March 31, 2000.

Plot
Arturo Ortega, a man with enduring aspirations of being a competitor in professional boxing. While Arturo had the intellect, ambition, and agility to be a professional, his career proved to be a short one, and, after a living out his fifteen minutes of fame, he’s washed up. However, Arturo has instilled his passion for boxing in his three sons, who have grown up learning all about the world of prizefighting. The three boys begin competing in the ring, with Arturo as their manager and coach, but Johnny swiftly displays so much promise that other managers and promoters want to take over his contract and put make him the next boxing champion. Arturo feels let down when Sonny decides that he wants to work with another manager, while his other two sons rail against Sonny for turning his back on his father and hope Arturo has the same conviction in their talents in the ring.

Cast
 Jimmy Smits as Arturo Ortega
 Maria del Mar as Rita Ortega
 Jon Seda as Sonny Ortega
Ulises Cuadra as Young Sonny Ortega
 Clifton Collins Jr. as Jimmy Ortega
Mario Esquivel as Young Jimmy Ortega
 Ernesto Hernandez as Johnny Ortega
Gilbert Leal as Young Johnny Ortega
 Ron Perlman as Nick Everson
 Louis Mandylor as Davey Lane
 Sal Lopez as Hector Salmon
Danielle Camastra as Mariella Cruz
 Paul Rodriguez as Pepe
Jeff Langton as Referee

Box office
The film grossed $3,440,228 in the United States and $108,328 in the foreign markets.

Critical reception
The film received negative reviews from critics. Film critic Roger Ebert gave the film a rating of two stars out of a possible four saying, "The film made me feel like I was sitting in McDonald's watching some guy shout at his kids."  Marc Savlov of the Austin Chronicle said of the film "It is a TKO before it even had a chance to get off a decent hook."  Price of Glory currently has a rating of 32 out of 100 on the popular website, Metacritic.  The film has a 33% "Fresh" rating on Rotten Tomatoes.

References

External links

2000 films
2000s sports films
American boxing films
2000 drama films
Shoreline Entertainment films
2000s English-language films
2000s American films